Adoration of the Holy Name of Jesus is a 1577-1579 oil on canvas painting by El Greco, produced early in his Toledo period and now in the Monasterio de El Escorial in Madrid. It is also known in modern scholarship as La Gloria, The Dream of Philip II or Allegory of the Holy League.

Description
The piece depicts the nominal "adoration of the Holy Name of Jesus. Beside Philip II are Pope Pius V and doge Sebastiano Venier, founders of the Holy League, and Don John of Austria, victor of the battle of Lepanto, all kneeling and worshipping the Holy Name of Jesus in the upper register, where it is surrounded by angels. In the bottom right is a hell-mouth in the form of Leviathan, influenced by Hieronymus Bosch. The colouring also shows the influence of the Venetian school and Michelangelo on the artist.

Production
Some art historians believe it is the first work commissioned from the artist by Philip II of Spain, who is shown at the bottom centre of the work. The National Gallery, London holds a preparatory sketch for it.

Bibliography
ÁLVAREZ LOPERA, José, El Greco, Madrid, Arlanza, 2005, Biblioteca «Descubrir el Arte», (colección «Grandes maestros»). .
SCHOLZ-HÄNSEL, Michael, El Greco, Colonia, Taschen, 2003. .
https://web.archive.org/web/20100918075748/http://www.artehistoria.jcyl.es/genios/cuadros/6304.htm

1570s paintings
Paintings by El Greco
Paintings in the collection of El Escorial